Mattias Thylander (born 22 October 1974) is a Swedish former football player, who played as a defender or midfielder.

Thylander started his career at his hometown club Höllvikens GIF before moving to Allsvenskan giants Malmö FF in 1991. He left Malmö following the club's relegation in 1999 to sign for rival club AIK. He also played for Halmstads BK, Silkeborg IF, and Trelleborgs FF before retiring in 2011.

External links 
  
 
 

Swedish footballers
1974 births
Living people
Association football defenders
Association football midfielders
Allsvenskan players
Danish Superliga players
Swedish expatriates in Denmark
Malmö FF players
AIK Fotboll players
Halmstads BK players
Silkeborg IF players
Trelleborgs FF players
Sweden international footballers
Sweden under-21 international footballers
Expatriate men's footballers in Denmark
Swedish expatriate footballers